The Lithuania women's national under-16 and under-17 basketball team is a national basketball team of Lithuania, administered by the Lithuanian Basketball Federation. It represents the country in women's international under-16 and under-17 basketball competitions.

FIBA U16 Women's European Championship participations

See also
Lithuania women's national basketball team
Lithuania women's national under-19 basketball team
Lithuania men's national under-16 and under-17 basketball team

References

External links
Archived records of Lithuania team participations

Basketball in Lithuania
Basketball
Women's national under-16 basketball teams
Women's national under-17 basketball teams